Michael Ross Borzello (born August 14, 1970) is an American professional baseball coach who has worked for the New York Yankees, Los Angeles Dodgers and Chicago Cubs of Major League Baseball (MLB).

In June 1991, Borzello signed with the St. Louis Cardinals. After five years as a minor league catcher in the Cardinals organization, he became a bullpen catcher and batting practice pitcher for the New York Yankees.  From 2007 to 2010, he was a Los Angeles Dodgers catching instructor. From 2011 through 2021, he served as a catching and strategy coach for the Chicago Cubs.

Early life
Borzello grew up in Tarzana, Los Angeles. He is the godson of former Major League manager Joe Torre, who was friends with Borzello's father. His sister, Keri Borzello, was an NCAA Women's College World Series participant in 1994, as a catcher and first baseman for the Missouri Tigers.  She later transferred to UCLA after a career ending rotator cuff injury.

Early in his life, a then-12-year-old Borzello had been serving as a batboy for the Atlanta Braves - at that time, managed by Torre - and found himself in the middle of a series of brawls between the Braves and the visiting San Diego Padres on August 12, 1984, at Atlanta–Fulton County Stadium. "When the fans started throwing stuff and jumped onto the field, I was like, 'OK, I gotta get out of here,' Borzello later said.

Career
Borzello graduated from Taft High School in Woodland Hills, Los Angeles, California and was a baseball player during his college years at California Lutheran University. He played as a catcher in Minor League Baseball in the farm system of the St. Louis Cardinals organization from 1991 through 1994, never getting above class A.

Borzello participated in spring training "replacement player" games in 1995. In 1996, after his playing career ended, Torre offered him a job with the New York Yankees as a bullpen catcher and batting practice pitcher. Borzello earned four World Series rings with the New York Yankees during the 1996, 1998, 1999, and 2000 seasons. When Torre left the Yankees for the Dodgers in 2007, he brought Borzello with him as catching instructor.

In 2011, Borzello left the Dodgers to join the Cubs as a coach, working with the catchers and scouting. He earned another World Series ring with the Cubs in the 2016 World Series. He was ejected for the first time in his career on August 29, 2020 (along with Cubs manager David Ross, Reds manager David Bell, Reds Designated Hitter Joey Votto, and Reds Left Fielder Jesse Winker). He was suspended for 1 game for his actions. On October 6, 2021, Cubs general manager Jed Hoyer announced that Borzello was departing the organization. Borzello coached under five different Cubs managers: Mike Quade, Dale Sveum, Rick Renteria, Joe Maddon, and Ross.

References

External links

Living people
Los Angeles Dodgers coaches
1970 births
Arizona League Cardinals players
Glens Falls Redbirds players
Madison Hatters players
Savannah Cardinals players
Major League Baseball bullpen catchers
New York Yankees coaches
Chicago Cubs coaches
William Howard Taft Charter High School alumni
Cal Lutheran Kingsmen baseball players